Gopal Sharan Nath Shahdeo (2 April 1969– 28 June 2010) was a prince of the Nagvanshi royal family. He was twice the state legislative assembly member from Hatia in 2005 and 2009 as Indian National Congress candidate.

Family 
He was the only son of Maharaj Lal Chintamani Sharan Nath Shahdeo and Maharani Prem Manjari Devi. He was married to Priyadarshini, the daughter of Mahendra Pratap Singh, the Raja of Shankargarh in 1989.

Death 
He died on 28 June 2010 due to heart attack in Varanasi.

References

Indian royalty
Indian National Congress politicians
Members of the Jharkhand Legislative Assembly
Jharkhand MLAs 2000–2005
Jharkhand MLAs 2009–2014
1969 births
2010 deaths
People from Ranchi
People from Ranchi district
Nagpuria people